Dominique Ducharme (born March 12, 1973) is a former Canadian professional ice hockey coach and former player. He is the former head coach of the Montreal Canadiens of the National Hockey League (NHL).

Playing career
Ducharme had a four-year standout career playing for the University of Vermont's men's ice hockey team. He ranks ninth all-time in points with 149, and seventh all-time in assists with 93 at UVM while playing alongside the likes of future NHLers and Stanley Cup champions Martin St. Louis and Tim Thomas.

After graduation, Ducharme began his professional career with splitting time between the Raleigh IceCaps and Huntington Blizzard of the ECHL along with the Cornwall Aces of the AHL in 1995–96. After that, he embarked on a five-year career in the French leagues, before retiring in 2002.

Coaching career
After retiring as a player, Ducharme spent one season as a coach for the University of Quebec at Trois-Rivieres team in 2002–03. In 2004, Ducharme took his first head coaching job, working with his hometown junior team, the Joliette L'Action in the Quebec Junior AAA Hockey League. He stayed there until 2008, when he accepted a position as an assistant coach with the Montreal Junior Hockey Club in the QMJHL, until taking a job with the Halifax Mooseheads in 2011.

Ducharme's first season with the Mooseheads saw the team finish 6th overall in the QMJHL, and second in the Maritimes Division reaching the semifinals of the President's Cup. In 2012–13, with top NHL Draft prospects like Nathan MacKinnon and Jonathan Drouin, Ducharme and the Mooseheads went 58–6–3–1, registering 347 goals for and only 176 goals against. In the 2013 President's Cup playoffs, Halifax lost just one game to capture its first QMJHL crown in team history. With automatic entry in to the 2013 Memorial Cup, the Mooseheads defeated the Portland Winterhawks 6–4, to win its first Memorial Cup title, and become the third-straight QMJHL team to win the tournament in as many years. For his efforts, Ducharme was awarded with the Ron Lapointe Trophy as the QMHJL's Coach of the Year.

Following the 2015–16 QMJHL season, Ducharme resigned his position with the Mooseheads and joined Drummondville as both head coach and general manager.

Ducharme has also been involved with Hockey Canada, first assisting on Quebec in the 2011 World Under-17 Hockey Challenge, and as an assistant coach for the Canada Under-18 National Team at the 2013 Ivan Hlinka Memorial Tournament. Ducharme served as the head coach for Canada during the 2017 World Junior Ice Hockey Championships, leading the team to a silver medal, and the 2018 World Junior Ice Hockey Championships, leading them to gold.

On April 27, 2018, Ducharme was hired as an assistant coach by the Montreal Canadiens, following the firings of J. J. Daigneault and Daniel Lacroix.

On February 24, 2021, Ducharme was promoted to interim head coach by the Canadiens, following the termination of Claude Julien and Kirk Muller. 

On June 19, 2021, Ducharme tested positive for COVID-19, placing him in isolation for 14 days; he continued work through phone calls and video calls, talking with the coaching staff and players as they won their semifinal playoff series against the Vegas Golden Knights, advancing to the 2021 Stanley Cup Finals.

On July 2, 2021, Ducharme rejoined the team for morning skate ahead of Game 3 of the 2021 Stanley Cup Finals. In the first Stanley Cup Final game at the Bell Centre the Canadiens were defeated by the Tampa Bay Lightning by a score of 6-3. The Canadiens would ultimately lose the series 4 games to 1.

On July 13, 2021, Ducharme was formally named the 31st head coach in Canadiens history, signing a three-year extension with the team.

On February 9, 2022, Ducharme was fired as head coach of the Montreal Canadiens; at the time of his departure, the Canadiens held a record of 8–30–7, last overall in the NHL.

Career statistics

Regular season and playoffs

Head coaching record

NHL

QMJHL

 Due to his Team Canada's stints, the total is the games he coached himself, excluding when he was with Team Canada.

Awards and honors

References

External links
 

1973 births
Living people
Canadian expatriate ice hockey players in France
Canadian ice hockey forwards
Canadian ice hockey coaches
Cornwall Aces players
Drummondville Voltigeurs coaches
Halifax Mooseheads coaches
Huntington Blizzard players
Ice hockey people from Quebec
Montreal Canadiens coaches
Raleigh IceCaps players
University of Vermont alumni
Vermont Catamounts men's ice hockey players